Kurtis Stryker is a fictional character in the Mortal Kombat fighting game franchise by Midway Games and NetherRealm Studios. Introduced in Mortal Kombat 3 (1995), he is a riot police officer selected by the thunder god Raiden to help defend Earthrealm against invading forces from Outworld. One of the franchise's few characters who does not possess any special powers, Stryker utilizes his equipment and weapons to defeat opponents.

Stryker has appeared in various media outside of the games, including as one of the central heroes in the animated series Mortal Kombat: Defenders of the Realm (1996). Upon his introduction, the character was negatively received for contrasting with the supernatural tone of the franchise. He remains one of the lesser-regarded fighters in the early Mortal Kombat games.

Development
It took Stryker several tries to break into the Mortal Kombat series. A character named "Kurtis Stryker" was to appear in the first Mortal Kombat, but the idea was dropped in place of a female fighter (Sonya Blade). This previously unused character would later appear in Mortal Kombat II with a different name, Jax, whose initial name was then finally reused for this character in Mortal Kombat 3. Stryker was made to be a SWAT-type character but with a sleeker design. The developers originally planned for him to have several additional weapons but memory limitations prevented this. Armageddon's early concept art and cast render showed that Stryker was to have his Mortal Kombat 3 look as his primary costume, but this was scrapped later on as this look was one of the sources of rejection over the character. He appeared in Mortal Kombat: Armageddon (2006) with a complete redesign into a much more futuristic-looking character.

Stryker employs modern weaponry such as explosives, firearms, tasers and nightsticks for his special moves and Fatalities. He is considered one of the top-tier Mortal Kombat 3 characters, especially after he was given his gun as a special move in Ultimate Mortal Kombat 3. (This move was intended to be in the original Mortal Kombat 3, but was taken out during play testing.) Although character designer and series co-creator John Tobias thought that he would become one of the most popular characters in the game, the opposite would turn true. Many reviled his "common man" appearance and special moves as being out of place in the fantasy world of Mortal Kombat. Ed Boon claimed him to be one of MK3's "hidden secrets" for precisely this reason. Stryker was purposely given a new appearance in Armageddon in order to make him look more appealing to critics of his original design. In 2012, Tobias admitted that he himself was not satisfied with the character and personally "hated" Stryker's design and backstory, and jokingly said that if he could go back in time and redo any characters, he would do it with Stryker and Kabal.

Appearances

Mortal Kombat games
Kurtis Stryker is a former Marine who had served in the Gulf War. During the events of Mortal Kombat 3, he was the leader of the Riot Control Brigade when Outworld's portal opened over New York City. Stryker attempted to keep order among the populace in the ensuing chaos, but soon all human souls were taken by Shao Kahn with the exception of those that belonged to the chosen warriors. Initially ignorant as to why he was one of the few souls that were spared in the wake of the invasion,  Stryker received a vision from Raiden, instructing him to head west in order to meet with the other chosen warriors and learn about the importance of his survival. He then entered the fray with the intention of avenging the lives of the innocent that he had vowed to protect and serve. Along with the other warriors, Stryker assisted in liberating Earthrealm from Shao Kahn's clutches.

He reappeared in Mortal Kombat: Armageddon, still oblivious as to why he was chosen by the Gods. In the Battle of Armageddon, he fights Mileena, Kabal and Kano, yet he ultimately is among the many combatants killed.

In the story mode of the 2011 Mortal Kombat reboot, featuring a new timeline, Stryker is Kabal's SWAT team leader who joins Raiden and his followers in repelling the Outworld invasion. He is later killed, along with most of the Earthrealm heroes, by Sindel and subsequently resurrected by Quan Chi and forced to fight Raiden, in a losing effort. Stryker appears briefly in Mortal Kombat X and Mortal Kombat 11, where he is still a revenant fighting for Quan Chi and Shinnok.

Other media

Stryker is one of the main characters in the 1996 animated series Mortal Kombat: Defenders of the Realm, as one of Raiden's chosen defenders of the Earthrealm alongside Liu Kang, Sub-Zero, Jax, Sonya, Nightwolf, and Kitana. He is depicted as a gruff disciplinarian who despised Nightwolf's pet wolf, Kiva, and his nightstick concealed an electronic device that closed dimensional rips that were caused by invading realms. Stryker plays his largest role in the seventh episode ("Fall from Grace"), in which Sonya's impetuousness on the battlefield results in him being injured in combat and confined to headquarters alone with the suspended Sonya, but they put aside their differences and work together to successfully defend the base from Shokan invaders. He had character traits of Johnny Cage given to him since Johnny Cage didn't appear in the cartoon. He was voiced by Ron Perlman, and his last name was misspelled as "Striker" in the closing credits.

In the 1997 film Mortal Kombat: Annihilation, Stryker is mentioned along with Kabal as "two of Earth's best warriors" who were captured and killed by Rain, but neither actually appeared onscreen; Rain is then promptly killed by Shao Kahn after he admits to not forcing them to beg for their lives. Stryker and Kabal feature in more detailed roles in the first draft of the script, in which they are prisoners slaving away in an Outworld cobalt mine that is overseen by Baraka and where Kitana is being held captive. After Liu Kang later infiltrates the prison and rescues Kitana after killing Baraka in battle, Stryker and Kabal organize the revolting prisoners in fighting off the guards. This subplot was omitted from future drafts and was not included in the novelization.

In the 2011 first season of director Kevin Tancharoen's web series Mortal Kombat: Legacy, Stryker appeared in the first two episodes as a SWAT leader under Jax's command, and was played by Tahmoh Penikett. When Sonya is held captive by Kano inside a warehouse where the Black Dragon conduct their operations, he and Jax are forced to conduct a raid in order to rescue her, resulting in Stryker and his team engaging in a gunfight with the Dragons. He later visits an injured Sonya in the hospital and informs her that Jax's arms were badly damaged after having protected her from an explosion. Eric Jacobus replaced Penikett for the 2013 second season, in which Stryker's most prominent appearances are in the third episode when Raiden fills in his chosen warriors about the tournament, and in the season finale when he treats Johnny Cage's wounds before they are both ambushed by Liu Kang, during which Stryker hits him with his Taser to little effect; Kung Lao intervenes as Liu Kang gains the upper hand and is about to finish Stryker and Cage off. In a 2013 interview with Nerd Reactor, Jacobus described Stryker as "definitely a fish out of water ... [h]e uses a gun where everyone else has fireballs," adding that the show's take on the character "doesn’t look like an LAPD donut-eating cop like from Mortal Kombat 3."

While Stryker did not appear in the 2021 movie adaption of Mortal Kombat, a police badge bearing his last name can be seen on Kabal's vest, suggesting that he may have been killed by the latter though special features refer to him as Kabal's fallen partner indicating Kabal is honoring him.

Stryker appears in Mortal Kombat Legends: Battle of the Realms, with Matthew Mercer reprising his role from Mortal Kombat 9. He is one of the new Earthrealm Fighters to participate in the Tournament. He battles against Baraka and beats him, however when he fights Shang Tsung, Shang takes control of him, making Stryker impale himself on wall spikes and tear off his own head.

Reception
The character has met with persistent mixed reception since his debut in MK3. In 2008, GameDaily ranked Stryker as the ninth-most bizarre fighting-game character, calling him "a joke" and comparing him to actor Steven Seagal. Game Informer included the "stun gun-wielding loser" among the characters they did not want to appear in the 2011 reboot game. Ryan Aston of Topless Robot rated Stryker atop his 2011 list of series characters "that are goofy even by Mortal Kombat standards," deeming him "utterly bizarre" because his "totally normal" appearance and weaponry contrasted with those of the other characters. Dustin Quillen of 1UP.com cited Stryker among "The Top Times Mortal Kombat Went Wrong" in 2012, opining the character did not "belong anywhere [in the series] at all" due to his lack of supernatural abilities.

In spite of all the criticism he has received, Stryker ranked 18th on UGO's 2012 list of the top 50 Mortal Kombat characters. That same year, Complex listed him as the sixth most underrated Mortal Kombat character: "[He] gets some unwarranted hate for being so normal, but that's exactly why we appreciate him." Den of Geek ranked Stryker sixteenth in their 2015 rating of the franchise's 64 playable characters, citing his sucker-punching of Mileena in Armageddon's opening cinematic sequence and Perlman's character portrayal: "[He] really became something worth caring about in the reboot, where he came off as a likeable, disgruntled smart-ass." In 2010, Play magazine listed Stryker one of the characters they wanted for the 2011 reboot, Robert Naytor of Hardcore Gaming 101 praised Stryker in the reboot as being "so badass" and "the closest thing you'll get to being John McClane in a fighting game."

Notes

References

Fictional American people in video games
Fictional Gulf War veterans
Fictional martial artists in video games
Fictional Huaquan practitioners
Fictional New York City Police Department sergeants
Fictional United States Marine Corps personnel
Fictional male martial artists
Fictional police officers in video games
Fictional stick-fighters
Male characters in video games
Mortal Kombat characters
Video game characters introduced in 1995
Video game protagonists
Vigilante characters in video games
Zombie and revenant characters in video games

fr:Kurtis Stryker
pl:Kurtis Stryker
pt:Kurtis Stryker